Pope Cyril II of Alexandria, 67th Pope of Alexandria and Patriarch of the See of St. Mark.

Patriarch Cyril attempted to ordain a properly consecrated bishop to be the new Abuna of the Ethiopian Orthodox Church, but Badr al-Jamali, the Vizier of Caliph Al-Mustansir, forced him to ordain instead Abuna Sawiros. Although at first warmly welcomed when he reached Ethiopia, the Caliph's candidate began to openly favor Islam in that Christian country by building seven mosques, ostensibly for the use of Muslim traders. This led to a general uproar in Ethiopia. Abuna Sawiros justified his acts by saying a refusal to build these mosques would result in a persecution in Egypt; nevertheless, the Abuna was imprisoned, the seven mosques destroyed, and restrictions placed on the Muslim traders. Reciprocal acts followed in Egypt, and a rupture in the relations between the two countries.

Sainthood
There had been a leadership dispute upon the selection of St. Cyril II as patriarch. According to the Coptic Church, a council of forty-seven bishops was assembled to depose him, and supported by a Muslim overseer of an orchard called Yaseeb. According to the Coptic Church, the Pope told the overseer 'If the Governor has authority, Christ has authority over the heaven and earth.' then dismounted his horse and made a matonia before him. Because of the Pope's words, it is claimed, the governor became enraged with the overseer, and beheaded him at the same place and at the same time as the matonia had been performed. This supposedly prevented a split in the church, and St. Cyril II and the dissenting bishops were reconciled.

Notes

11th-century Coptic Orthodox popes of Alexandria